The Biá River is a river of Amazonas state in north-western Brazil. It is a tributary of the Jutaí River.

The  Cujubim Sustainable Development Reserve, established in 2003, lies on either side of the river in the municipality of Jutaí.
It is the largest conservation unit in Amazonas and the largest sustainable development reserve in the world.

See also
List of rivers of Amazonas

References

Sources

Rivers of Amazonas (Brazilian state)